Kevin Kandala (born 13 June 1992) is a Zimbabwean first-class cricketer who plays for Matabeleland Tuskers.

References

External links
 

1992 births
Living people
Zimbabwean cricketers
Matabeleland Tuskers cricketers
Sportspeople from Kwekwe